Silas Woodson (May 18, 1819October 9, 1896) was the 21st Governor of Missouri, United States, between January 3, 1873, and January 12, 1875. He was notable for being the first Democrat elected to that position since the Civil War. No Republican would reach the office for over 30 years after Woodson's election.

Early life

Woodson was born in Barbourville, Kentucky,  to mother Alice (Chick), and father Wade Netherland Woodson

He was the most outspoken opponent of slavery at Kentucky’s 1849 constitutional convention and left the state after the passage of the 1850 constitution enshrined it in state law.

Legal career

Woodson became a lawyer. In 1846 he became partners with Samuel Freeman Miller. Woodson gained a reputation as a trial lawyer.

Political career

Silas had made one previously unsuccessful attempt for the Missouri Legislature in 1868, but was chosen to run in 1873 against Republican Senator John B. Henderson. Woodson beat Henderson 156,777 votes to 121,889.

In his inaugural address, Governor Woodson spoke about education, in particular defending the Democrat position regarding common schools. Historian Arthur Lee commented this showed the institutionalization of public schooling in Missouri.

As part of his time as governor, Woodson brought a case against Pacific Railroad for non-payment of a state-issued debt. The Railroad had contended that it was unable to repay $2 million lent to it due to the impact of the Civil War. Woodson had responded by attempting a sale of the Railroad in default. In the 1874 case of Woodson v Murdock, the Supreme Court found in favor of the Railroad.

In 1875, Silas Woodson was briefly investigated for his role in co-signing certificates issued during the Civil War by the Crafton Commission. Woodson owned $198,045 worth of the certificates personally. He was exonerated after it was shown that Crafton had been forging then-Governor Woodson's signature on certificates for defective muster rolls.

Death
Woodson died in Saint Joseph, Missouri.  He is buried at the Mount Mora Cemetery in Saint Joseph, Missouri.  His headstone was vandalized in October 2006.

References

Missouri State Archives Finding Aid 3.21 http://www.sos.mo.gov/archives/resources/findingaids/rg003-21.pdf
"GOVERNOR SILAS WOODSON" page, "The Woodsons and Their Connections," Volume 1, pages 103, 104, and 105, compiled and published by Henry Morton Woodson, 1915 online at: http://woodsonfamilypage.0catch.com/GovernorSilasWoodson.html
"Descendants of Wade Netherland Woodson and Mary Harris Woodson and Alice Cheek Woodson" page, Cobb-Sasser Family Lineage site http://cobbsasser.com/WoodsnWadeMryHarisAlCheek.html
The following article about his law partner in Barbourville, Kentucky contains information about Woodson too: Michael Ross, "Hill Country Doctor: The Early Life and Career of Supreme Court Justice Samuel F. Miller in Kentucky, 1816–1849," The Filson History Quarterly, Vol. 71 (October 1997): 430–462.

Democratic Party governors of Missouri
1819 births
1896 deaths
People from Barbourville, Kentucky
19th-century American politicians